Andrzej Gajewski (born August 29, 1964 in Śrem) is a Polish sprint canoer who competed from the late 1980s to the mid-1990s. He won two medals in the K-4 10000 m event at the ICF Canoe Sprint World Championships with a silver in 1990 and a bronze in 1989.

Gajewski also finished sixth in the K-1 1000 m event at the 1996 Summer Olympics in Atlanta.

References

Sports-reference.com profile

1964 births
Canoeists at the 1996 Summer Olympics
Living people
Olympic canoeists of Poland
Polish male canoeists
People from Śrem
ICF Canoe Sprint World Championships medalists in kayak
Sportspeople from Greater Poland Voivodeship